The 2012 PLSQ season was the first season of existence for the Première ligue de soccer du Québec, a Division 3 men's semi-professional soccer league and the highest level of soccer fully contained within the province of Quebec.  It is below Major League Soccer and the North American Soccer League in the Canadian soccer league system.

FC Saint-Léonard were the league champions for the inaugural season.

Teams
The 2012 season was contested between five teams. Each team will play 16 regular season games, as well as four exhibition matches with each team playing a match against the Montreal Impact Academy, the U23 team of Quebec, Alymer, and one other semi-professional team.

Standings

Top scorers

Awards

References

External links

Premiere
Première ligue de soccer du Québec seasons